Many New York City Subway stations are decorated with colorful ceramic plaques and tile mosaics. Of these, many take the form of signs, identifying the station's location. Much of this ceramic work was in place when the subway system originally opened on October 27, 1904. Newer work continues to be installed each year, much of it cheerful and fanciful.

Original IRT and BMT tiles

Heins & LaFarge (1901–1907) 

The earliest ceramic work was done by Heins & LaFarge (artists George C. Heins and Christopher Grant LaFarge), starting in 1901 and continuing up to 1907. Heins and LaFarge were both relatives of John LaFarge (brother-in-law and son, respectively), a leading stained-glass artisan of the day. They were part of the Arts and Crafts movement and worked in the Beaux-Arts architecture style, both of which were very much in vogue at the turn of the 20th century. At the time of their hiring they had completed large projects at the Cathedral of St. John the Divine and the Bronx Zoo's Astor Court. In addition to designing the artistic motifs, Heins and LaFarge also did much of the architectural work that determined the overall appearance of entire subway stations.

They designed name tablets that were made up of tiles with the station name in serif and sans serif roman lettering, with all of the letters capitalized. Some of the tiles by Heins and LaFarge are for station directional information such as directions to exits, platforms of different lines and systems, and platforms of different directions. The name tablets in each station contained elaborate border tilework surrounding the tablet.

Heins and LaFarge knew what materials would stand up well to heavy-duty cleaning and scrubbing; they worked with the ceramic-producing firms Grueby Faience Company of Boston and Rookwood Pottery of Cincinnati. 

Their ceramic artwork includes colorful pictorial motifs relevant to a station's location, for example:
 The South Ferry loop station is decorated by 15 bas-relief representations of a sailing ship on the water.
 The Astor Place station is decorated with large ceramic beaver emblems, representing the beaver pelts that helped make John Jacob Astor wealthy.
 The 116th Street – Columbia University station includes a bas-relief emblem representing nearby Columbia University.

Their bas-reliefs in the subway have been likened to the work of the Italian Renaissance artist Andrea Della Robbia. Much of their tile work was station-identifying signs to guide passengers. Besides serving an aesthetic function, the images are helpful to New York City's large population of non-English speakers and those who can't read. A traveler can be told to "get off at the stop with the picture of a beaver." As well as pictorial plaques and ceramic signs, Heins and LaFarge designed the running decorative motifs, such as egg-and-dart patterns, along station ceilings.

In addition to their wall-side tilework, Heins and LaFarge “hung large, illuminated porcelain-enamel signs over the express platforms, using black type [actually hand-lettering] on a white background and painted station names on the round cast-iron columns.”

Squire Vickers (1906–1942) 
In 1906, Squire J. Vickers, then a young architect, was hired. Vickers showed much respect for Heins and LaFarge, but his work consists much more of mosaics; he did not use bas-relief, citing the need for easy cleaning. Vickers also preserved the fonts that Heins and LaFarge used in their name tablets; however, in Vickers's new name tablets, the tilework on the borders of the tablets was more simplified.

In his pictorial work, Vickers emphasizes actual buildings as landmarks, such as his colorful depiction of Brooklyn Borough Hall (1919) at the station of that name, rather than Heins and LaFarge's beavers and sailing ships. He describes his technique:

Through the 1930s, Vickers ordered some enamel signs for the IRT and BMT from both Nelke Signs and the Baltimore Enamel Company. These signs were located on girder and cast-iron columns, and made them easier to identify stations. Shortened station names on the porcelain-enamel signs had a condensed sans serif capital-letter font.

Vickers continued to work on subway projects for 36 years, until 1942.

2007 exhibitions 

Two exhibitions, one celebrating the work of Heins & LaFarge and one for Vickers, were mounted at the New York Transit Museum's Gallery Annex at Grand Central Terminal during 2007.

IND tiles
The tiles used in the Independent Subway System (IND) are very simple and austere, and usually are only of four colors: white, black, and the station-specific band and border colors of the tile. Instead of using the serif and sans-serif fonts of the IRT and BMT, the IND used a blocky geometric font, an altered version of the previous sans-serif font. The Art Deco-influenced form of the IND's tiles was designed in part by Vickers, who integrated directional signs mainly into the walls themselves.

The station-specific tiles used in the IND's stations are all color-coded in a specific five-color pattern, as they had originally been designed to facilitate navigation for travelers going away from Manhattan. With one exception, these groupings follow the same order going outbound: purple (violet), blue, green, yellow, and red. The exception is on the IND Fulton Street Line: Utica Avenue/Ralph Avenue/Rockaway Avenue (red family) is followed by blue family stations, Broadway Junction, Liberty Avenue, Van Siclen Avenue, and Shepherd Avenue, then purple (Euclid Avenue), then green (Grant Avenue). As one goes uptown or away from Manhattan, the color of the tiles changes whenever there is an express station on a physical line. Thus, a local station that comes directly west of an express station has the same color tiles as the next express station away from Manhattan.  Express stations have wider tile bands than local stations, except on certain stations on the southern portion of the IND Eighth Avenue Line, where the station walls have been refurbished. Tablets are simple, with a common design, and black tile with white letters spell out the station name on the wall.

There are also nuances on the tile bands along the Eighth Avenue Line, the first of the IND lines to be opened. Since there were nine express stations along the line, there were ten color groupings, which meant that there were two tile families of the same color on the same line. The line started with the purple family tiles at High Street, and the fifth express station on the line was at 42nd Street, where the tile color pattern started over from the purple family tiles. Therefore, 42nd Street and all stations north contained band borders that consisted of half-height black tiles. The next station south, 34th Street–Penn Station, and all stations south contained band borders with half-height tiles that were of a deeper shade of that station's tile colors. For instance, 34th Street would have a red tile color and a deep red tile band border.

Most pre-1955 IND stations have tile plaques with the station name, as well as a colored stripe with black borders, on the platforms or track walls. Tile plaques only exist in stations where there is a wall next to the platform. The number of tiles between the stripes are 2 tiles for local stations and three for express/transfer stations. Several original stations that were renovated, such as Lexington Avenue / 53rd Street, have no color.

The IND Crosstown Line, having no express stations, uses three forms of green in its tile bands, with light green indicating transfer stations. (Broadway was planned as a transfer to an unbuilt IND Second System line; thus, the walls at Broadway have three rows of tiles, rather than the two rows of tiles found on other Crosstown Line stations' walls).

Newer tiles

Glazed tiles (1950s–1970s)
By the 1950s, trains were increased in length from 5 cars to 8–10 cars. Glazed tiles in colors such as dull green, ochre, and blue adorned the new station extensions' walls. Letters were screened onto the tiles in black sans serif font.

Porcelain tiles (late 2000s–present)
New stations on the Second Avenue Subway have porcelain tiles and built-in artwork.

The walls adjacent to the tracks at the new 34th Street station have white tiles arranged in sets of three columns of 3 tiles each. There are two-tile-high gray squares containing white "34"s in the middle of each set of columns.

The South Ferry station has white porcelain tiles separated by rows of metal.

Renovated and new tiles in existing stations
Several subway stations have new ceramics and mosaics:
 The 28th Street station on the BMT Broadway Line features the fanciful "City Dwellers" mosaic by Mark Hadjipateras.
 The Houston Street station on the IRT Broadway – Seventh Avenue Line displays "Platform Diving" by Deborah Brown.
 The 81st Street – Museum of Natural History station on the IND Eighth Avenue Line has "For Want of a Nail" by the MTA Arts for Transit Design Team.
 The Prince Street station on the BMT Broadway Line shows "Carrying On", an artwork by Janet Zweig.
 The Cathedral Parkway – 110th Street station on the IND Eighth Avenue Line boasts "Migration" by artist Christopher Wynter.
The 191st Street station on the IRT Broadway – Seventh Avenue Line has been renovated with reproductions of its original tile work.

References

Further reading 

 Sapulding, Lee (2010). Subway Mosaics: New York City, CreateSpace. 
 Stookey, Lee (1994). Subway Ceramics. North Haven, CT: William J. Mack Co.

External links

MTA Arts for Transit-The Official NYC Subway Art and Rail Art Guide
New York - New Mosaics
Subway Art Guide

New York City Subway
American pottery